Bayfest may refer to the following annual music festivals:

Bayfest (Corpus Christi), Texas
Bayfest (Mobile), Alabama
Sarnia Bayfest or Rogers Bayfest, Sarnia, Ontario